Angela Mullens (born 16 December 1968) is an Australian former freestyle swimmer of the 1990s, who competed in the 1992 Summer Olympics in Barcelona, Spain.

Mullens, who was from Moree, competed in the Women's 4 × 100 metre freestyle relay. The Australian team finished ninth and, therefore, did not make the final.

Two years earlier Mullens had been a member of the women's 4 x 100 metre freestyle relay team who won gold at the 1990 Commonwealth Games in Auckland.

References 

1968 births
Living people
Olympic swimmers of Australia
Swimmers at the 1992 Summer Olympics
Australian female freestyle swimmers
Swimmers at the 1990 Commonwealth Games
Commonwealth Games gold medallists for Australia
Commonwealth Games medallists in swimming
People from Moree, New South Wales
Sportswomen from New South Wales
20th-century Australian women
Medallists at the 1990 Commonwealth Games